Star Building is a historic commercial building located at Terre Haute, Vigo County, Indiana. It was built in 1912, and is a four-story, Chicago school style brick building.  It features limestone and terra cotta detailing and a pressed metal decorative cornice. The building was built to house the Terre Haute Star newspaper.

It was listed on the National Register of Historic Places in 1983.

References

Commercial buildings on the National Register of Historic Places in Indiana
Commercial buildings completed in 1912
Buildings and structures in Terre Haute, Indiana
National Register of Historic Places in Terre Haute, Indiana
1912 establishments in Indiana
Chicago school architecture in Indiana